"Edge of a Broken Heart" is a power ballad by the American glam metal band Vixen, that was released as a single in 1988. It was written by Richard Marx, who was also on keyboards, and Fee Waybill. The song peaked at No. 26 on the Billboard Hot 100, and although the band had another top 40 hit on that chart, "Cryin'", they are often cited as a one-hit wonder, with this song "being their one hit".

Music video
The song's video received heavy rotation on MTV. Richard Marx, a popular soft rock artist and co-writer/producer of this song, has a cameo in the video.

Legacy
In 2018, Vixen released a new acoustic version of the song on their Live Fire album.

Charts

References

1980s ballads
1988 singles
1988 songs
Glam metal ballads
EMI Records singles
Manhattan Records singles
Songs written by Fee Waybill
Songs written by Richard Marx
Vixen (band) songs